Rodin is a surname. Notable people with the surname include: 

 Alexandr Rodin (1947–2022), Belarusian painter
 Alexey Grigoryevich Rodin (1902–1955), Soviet general
 Auguste Rodin (1840–1917), French sculptor, for whom is named:
 Rodin (crater), a crater on Mercury
 6258 Rodin, an asteroid
 Rodin (film), a 2017 film about Auguste Rodin
 Burton Rodin (born 1933), American mathematician
 Dmitry Rodin (1912–1992), Red Army officer
 Georgy Rodin (1897–1976), Red Army general
 Gil Rodin (1906–1974), American jazz saxophonist
 Ivan Rodin (born 1987), Russian football player
 Janko Rodin (1900–1974), Croatian football player
 Judith Rodin (born 1944), American university administrator
 Nikolay Ivanovich Rodin (1924–2013), Soviet pilot
 Odile Rodin (1937–2018), French actress
 Oleh Rodin (born 1956), Russian football player
 Viktor Rodin (1928–2011), Soviet general

See also 
 Roden (disambiguation)
 Rodin Platform, a theorem proving tool for the B-Method

Russian-language surnames
French-language surnames